Riau Ega Agatha Salsabila (born 25 November 1991) is an Indonesian recurve archer. He represented Indonesia at the 2016 and 2020 Summer Olympics.

Career
At the 2013 Islamic Solidarity Games, Ega Agatha won gold along with partner Ika Yuliana Rochmawati in the mixed team recurve category. He competed in the individual recurve event  and the team recurve event at the 2015 World Archery Championships in Copenhagen, Denmark.

2015 Southeast Asian Games

In the 2015 Southeast Asian Games, Ega Agatha won silver in the men's team recurve event, along with Hendra Purnama & Muhammad Hanif Wijaya. In the mixed team recurve event, he along with partner Ika Yuliana Rochmawati won the gold medal.

2016 Summer Olympics

Ega Agatha, along with compatriot Hendra Purnama & Muhammad Hanif Wijaya, qualified for the 2016 Summer Olympics in Rio de Janeiro. The three of them would be competing in the men's individual and team category.

In the men's team category, the Indonesia team scored a total of 1962 from 216 arrows in the ranking round, scoring 48 10s and 23 Xs, the team managed to rank ten out of twelve teams overall. In the 1/8 Eliminations, the team met seventh-ranked Chinese Taipei, consisting of Kao Hao-wen, Wei Chun-heng, and Yu Guan-lin. Indonesia went on to win 6–2 after two wins and two ties. In the Quarterfinals, they were put up against second-ranked United States, consisting of Brady Ellison, Zach Garrett, and Jake Kaminski. Indonesia went on to lose 2–6 after they had equalized points 2–2 in the second set.

In the men's individual, Ega Agatha ranked 32 out of 64 participants, scoring a total of 660 from 72 arrows with 26 10s and 7 Xs. He met Xing Yu of China in the first round, and went on to win 7-1. He then was put up against first-ranked Kim Woo-jin of South Korea, who had just broken the world record the previous day in the ranking round. However, in an upset, Ega Agatha won the match 6–2 against the world champion. He went on until the Round of 16, where he was beaten by Italy's Mauro Nespoli, who had beaten Ega Agatha's compatriot Muhammad Hanif Wijaya earlier on.

2020 Summer Olympics

Ega Agatha, along with compatriot Arif Dwi Pangestu and Alviyanto Prastyadi, qualified for the 2020 Summer Olympics in Tokyo, Japan. The three of them competed in the men's individual and team category. He also played in the mixed team category along with partner Diananda Choirunisa.

References

External links
 

1991 births
Living people
People from Blitar
Sportspeople from East Java
Indonesian male archers
Archers at the 2016 Summer Olympics
Archers at the 2020 Summer Olympics
Olympic archers of Indonesia
Archers at the 2018 Asian Games
Asian Games bronze medalists for Indonesia
Asian Games medalists in archery
Medalists at the 2018 Asian Games
Competitors at the 2011 Southeast Asian Games
Competitors at the 2013 Southeast Asian Games
Competitors at the 2015 Southeast Asian Games
Competitors at the 2017 Southeast Asian Games
Competitors at the 2019 Southeast Asian Games
Competitors at the 2021 Southeast Asian Games
Southeast Asian Games gold medalists for Indonesia
Southeast Asian Games silver medalists for Indonesia
Southeast Asian Games bronze medalists for Indonesia
Southeast Asian Games medalists in archery
21st-century Indonesian people
Islamic Solidarity Games medalists in archery